The Augustana (South Dakota) Vikings men's ice hockey is an announced NCAA Division I ice hockey team that is set to begin play in the fall of 2023.

History
In the summer of 2021, in accordance with plans for Augustana University to raise its athletic programs from NCAA Division II to Division I, the university announced that there was interest in adding a men's ice hockey program. After receiving donations from several sources, spearheaded by T. Denny Sanford, the school was able to move forward with plans for the program. On October 5, the school broke ground on the Midco Arena, a $40 million, 3,000-seat venue that the team will use as its home rink.

The program will be the first varsity ice hockey team at any level to call South Dakota home.

On April 18, 2022, the program announced the hiring of Minnesota Golden Gophers' assistant coach Garrett Raboin as the team's inaugural head coach. On May 17, 2022, it was announced that the Vikings will become a member of the Central Collegiate Hockey Association, playing a transitional schedule its first two years before playing a full CCHA schedule come the 2025-26 season.

References

 
Ice hockey teams in South Dakota